The Dog House is a Channel 4 observational television show, following staff at an animal shelter trying to find homes for dogs. Channel 4 describes it as "The dog dating show where people and dogs are matched and - hopefully - fall in love."

List of episodes

Series 1: 2019

Series 2: 2021

The Dog House at Christmas: 2021

Series 3: 2022

Filming
The Dog House is filmed at the Wood Green Animal Shelter in Godmanchester, Cambridgeshire.

Reception

The Daily Telegraph said The Dog House was “the most charming – and emotional – show on TV” and The Guardian called it “feelgood TV at its fluffiest.”

Release

International broadcast
It was reported in May 2020 that HBO Max had acquired the U.S. streaming rights for the series, then released the first season in June 2020 and the second season in June 2021.

International versions
The Dog House Australia first broadcast on Network 10 in October 2021 and is narrated by Chris Brown.  It is filmed in Kemps Creek at the Animal Welfare League NSW.

See also
 Pet Rescue 
 The Pet Rescuers
 Bondi Vet

References

External links
 
 Wood Green Animal Shelters, the host organisation

Channel 4 original programming
HBO Max original programming
English-language television shows
2010s British reality television series
2019 British television series debuts
2020s British reality television series